James Joseph Nejdl (1874 – 1938) was a politician from the U.S. state of Indiana. In 1924 and 1925 he served as acting Lieutenant Governor of Indiana.

Life
James Nejdl was born on 24 November 1874 in the Bohemian Kingdom which later became the Czech Republic. He emigrated to the United States in 1898 with his parents to Chicago. Like his family, James was a bricklayer who turned contractor. James and Mary, his wife, settled down in Whiting, Indiana, sometime before 1900. James joined the Whiting City Council in 1902, and left in 1904. James was appointed as Post Master General July 1, 1909.

Political career
He joined the Republican Party and was elected to the Indiana Senate in 1916, inaugurated 1917. He was elected as one of two senators from Lake County. Although he received the fewest votes, of three candidates, at the primaries Nejdl still moved on to November.

James became the President Pro Tempore after a scandal hit Indiana. On 30 April 1924 Governor Warren T. McCray resigned from his office following his conviction for mail fraud. His Lieutenant Governor Emmett Forrest Branch followed him as new Governor of Indiana. According to the state constitution the now vacant position of the Lieutenant Governor was filled by the President Pro Tempore of the State Senate, James Nejdl. He served in this position between 30 April 1924 and 12 January 1925 when his term ended.

Pension Legislative Work
James's big two legislative contributions were of Wet Laws/Petitions and Old-Age Pensions.

Death
His wife died in 1937. James Nejdl died on 3 July 1938 in Cook County in Illinois. He died of Pneumonia at the age of 63.

External links 
 
 The Political Graveyard
 Newspaper Article from 26 February 1925, showing Nejdl as President Pro Tempore of the Indiana Senate
 "James J. Nejdl, Calumet Immigrant Who Became Political Power, Dies", Indianapolis Star, July 6, 1938, page 4.

1874 births
1938 deaths
Republican Party Indiana state senators
Lieutenant Governors of Indiana